Matthew Joseph O'Malley is an American politician and businessman who served as president of the Boston City Council in 2021. He was elected as the District 6 representative in a special election on November 16, 2010, and was re-elected in 2011, 2013, 2015, and 2017. His district included the neighborhoods of West Roxbury and Jamaica Plain, parts of Roslindale and Roxbury, and the Back of the Hill. As the most senior member of the council, O'Malley succeeded Kim Janey as acting council president after Janey became acting mayor of Boston in March 2021. In late 2021, he became the chief sustainability officer of Vicinity Energy, a U.S. district energy subsidiary of Antin Infrastructure Partners.

O'Malley grew up in Roslindale and now resides in West Roxbury with his wife, Kathryn Niforos. In the 2013 election, O'Malley won 18,204 votes, or 85% of the District, beating the record for most votes ever received by a district city councilor, previously held by Thomas Menino.

O'Malley was a member of the Democratic State Committee from 2008 to 2012 and the Advisory Committee for Project Hope, an anti-poverty agency in Boston. He also raised funds through the Boston Marathon for Children's Hospital and Habitat for Humanity, Greater Boston.

Early life and career

O'Malley grew up in Roslindale and now owns a home in West Roxbury. He is a graduate of Boston Latin School as well as the George Washington University, where he studied Political Science and English.

In high school, he served as an intern at Boston City Hall for former At-Large City Councilor, Peggy Davis-Mullen, and as a Ward Fellow for former Treasurer and Receiver-General of Massachusetts, Joe Malone, which he says "helped shape my interest in local government."

His professional political experience began in managing the campaign for Suffolk County Sheriff Andrea Cabral in 2004, the first female in the Commonwealth of Massachusetts history to hold the position. O'Malley also served as the Director of Legislative Affairs for Suffolk County, where he worked to implement numerous crime prevention initiatives.

For the following two years, O'Malley served as the political director for MassEquality. Additionally, O'Malley spent some time working as a political consultant for both the Steven Grossman and Stephen Pagliuca campaigns respectively. In 2010, O'Malley was elected for City Council during a special election.

Starting in 2017, Councilor O'Malley began hosting a podcast called, the "O'Pod," where he interviews fellow elected officials, city workers, notable people, his staff, family, and friends. Guests have included, Congressman Joe Kennedy III, 2018 Boston Marathon women's winner Desiree Linden, and former Boston City Councilor John M. Tobin Jr.

Boston City Council

O'Malley chaired the Environment and Parks Committee, and was co-chair of the Education committee and the Arts and Culture committee.

He also served on the City Council Committees on Arts & Culture, Ways & Means, and the Special Committee on Charter Reform. In 2012 and 2013 Councilor O'Malley served as Chair of the City Council's Government Operations Committee and as Chair of the Environment Committee in 2011.

2010–2011
O'Malley pushed for the expansion of a drug drop off program in Boston as well as the creation of a Silver Alert system for citizens with Alzheimer's disease and other cognitive impairments. He has held public hearings to discuss vacated public school buildings, Arborway Year in Jamaica Plain, and snow removal jurisdiction (City B). Additionally, O'Malley pushed for paperless pay stubs for City of Boston employees, and continues working toward increasing the availability of tap water in open spaces and parks across Boston.

2012–2013
In 2012, O'Malley pushed for new energy-saving considerations in City buildings such as City Hall to measure how much energy it was using and whether or not it was efficient. He also introduced a hearing order to explore curbside composting in Boston. His hearing on ways to reduce to litter in Boston led to the creation of Clean Boston Task Force, a group of Boston residents who meet to discuss problem areas in Boston, and solutions that have worked in their communities.

In December 2012, the City Council passed an ordinance authored by O'Malle to greatly increase the scope and amount of inspections made to rental properties in Boston. It went into effect.

2014–2015
One of O'Malley's proudest achievements was getting free sunscreen dispensers placed in parks throughout the city. In the summer of 2015, with help from IMPACT Melanoma and Make Big Change (MBC), dispensers were installed and have since inspired cities around the country to do the same. These dispensers were featured on season 28, episode 3 of "The Simpsons," when Homer takes the family on a "hate-cation" to Boston.
That same year, Councilor O’Malley and District 8 City Councilor Josh Zakim filed an order for a public hearing on gas leaks in Boston.  A hearing and a working session were held by the City Council's Environment & Parks Committee to examine the issue. Councilors O’Malley and Zakim also sponsored two City Council resolutions in support of state legislation on roadway gas leak repair and protecting customers from paying for unaccounted for gas.  Both were passed unanimously by the City Council.

2016–2017
In 2016, O'Malley successfully passed an ordinance regarding the elimination of gas leaks in the City of Boston following a hearing on the environmental and economic impacts of gas leaks the year before. Docket #0622 aims to eliminate gas leaks in the City of Boston within six years of the passage of the ordinance. Earlier that year, O'Malley passed an ordinance dubbed the "Puppy Mill Bill," that would prohibit  pet shops in Boston from selling dogs, cats or rabbits and would prevent animal sales in public parks and on city streets. As a result, Boston joined more than 120 municipalities that have banned the sale of commercially bred puppies and kittens from pet shops. Its aim was to diminish large-scale breeding facilities employed by these commercial facilities, many of which have multiple violations of the Federal Animal Welfare Act.

In October 2017, the Boston City Council voted to unanimously approve a resolution by O'Malley and fellow councilor Michelle Wu, having the city adopt Community Choice Aggregation.

In December 2017, O'Malley received unanimous support from his fellow Boston City Council members in passing an ordinance he had authored with fellow councilor Michelle Wu to ban single-use plastic bags from stores in the City of Boston. Mayor Marty Walsh signed it into law despite his administration having previously opposed such a ban when it was previously debated by the Council in 2016. The law went into effect in the fall of 2018. This achievement came with many environmental benefits, including litter and pollution reduction.

2018–2019

in 2019, O'Malley and fellow councilor Andrea Campbell proposed the idea of a vacancy tax on residential and commercial properties that have been abandoned.

In December 2019, the Boston City Council passed an ordinance that O'Malley had introduced with Michelle Wu that protects local wetlands and promote adaption to climate change. Mayor Walsh signed it into law later that month.

Malley ran unopposed in the 2019 Boston City Council election, and was re-elected.

For the 2020 Democratic Party presidential primaries, he gave his endorsement to Elizabeth Warren's candidacy.

2020–2021
In December 2020, O'Malley announced that he would not seek re-election in the November 2021 election. After council president Kim Janey became the acting Mayor of Boston in March 2021, O'Malley began serving as president of the council, officially as president pro tempore.

O'Malley voted against legislation that was passed by the City Council which restricted the use of rubber bullets, tear gas, and pepper spray by the Boston Police Department.

In October 2021, the City Council passed and Acting Mayor Janey signed into law an ordinance sponsored by O'Malley requiring buildings in the city that are larger than 20,000 square feet to reach net-zero carbon emissions by the year 2050 and setting emissions reporting requirements for such buildings.

Post-Council employment
In December 2021, O'Malley announced his new position as Chief Sustainability Officer for Vicinity Energy, the largest district energy provider in the United States.

Personal life
O'Malley and his wife, Kathryn, have one daughter. His second cousin is Jen O'Malley Dillon.

References

Further reading

External links
 Profile at boston.gov

1979 births
Living people
21st-century American politicians
Boston City Council members
Columbian College of Arts and Sciences alumni
Massachusetts Democrats
People from Roslindale
People from West Roxbury, Boston